The 1986 European Athletics Indoor Championships were held at the Palacio de los Deportes in Madrid, Spain, on 22 and 23 February 1986. The track used at the stadium at the time was 164 metres long.

Medal summary

Men

Women

Medal table

Participating nations

 (11)
 (2)
 (13)
 (3)
 (16)
 (1)
 (23)
 (7)
 (22)
 (1)
 (17)
 (5)
 (5)
 (3)
 (17)
 (4)
 (15)
 (7)
 (9)
 (21)
 (29)
 (7)
 (4)
 (1)
 (25)
 (2)

See also
 1986 in athletics (track and field)

References

External links
 Results - men at GBRathletics.com
 Results - women at GBRathletics.com
 EAA

 
European Indoor
European Athletics Indoor Championships
International athletics competitions hosted by Spain
European Indoor Athletics
Sports competitions in Madrid
1980s in Madrid
European Athletics Indoor Championships